Guram Gudashvili (born 28 December 1941) is a Georgian athlete. He competed in the men's discus throw at the 1968 Summer Olympics, representing the Soviet Union.

References

External links
 

1941 births
Living people
Athletes (track and field) at the 1968 Summer Olympics
Male discus throwers from Georgia (country)
Olympic athletes of the Soviet Union
Place of birth missing (living people)
Soviet male discus throwers